Australia competed at the 1970 British Commonwealth Games in Edinburgh Scotlandfrom 16 to 25 July 1970. It was Australia's ninth appearance at the Commonwealth Games, having competed at every Games since their inception in 1930.

Australia won medals in eight of the ten sports that it entered.

Medallists

The following Australian competitors won medals at the games.

|  style="text-align:left; width:78%; vertical-align:top;"|

| width="22%" align="left" valign="top" |

Officials
Commandant & General Manager - Arthur Tunstall 
Assistant General manager - Eric Hayman 
Assistant Managers Women - Esna Hopewell, Masie McQuiston  
Administrative Officer - Ivan Lund 
Advance Party - David McKenzie, Bill Young 
Attache - Kenneth Breechin 
Medical Officer - Dr Robert Tinning ; Masseur - George Saunders
Section Officials - Athletics Manager - Graeme Briggs, Athletics Coaches - Stewart Embling, Jack Pross, William Edgecombe ; Badminton Coach/Manager - Ronald Whittle ; Lawns Bowls Coach/Manager - Harold Leedham ; Boxing Manager/Coach - John Hare ; Cycling Manager - Howard Bergstrom, Cycling Coach/Trainer - Harold Johnson ; Fencing Manager/Coach - Laurence Smith ; Swimming Manager - Archie Steinbeck, Swimming Coaches - Arthur Cusack, Don Talbot ; Diving Coach - Thomas Donnet ; Weightlifting Manager/Coach - Sam Coffa ; Wrestling Manager/Coach -John Bourke

See also
 Australia at the 1968 Summer Olympics
 Australia at the 1972 Summer Olympics

References

External links 
Commonwealth Games Australia Results Database

1970
Nations at the 1970 British Commonwealth Games
British Commonwealth Games